Buryat Cuisine is the traditional cuisine of the Buryats, a Mongolic people who mostly live in the Buryat Republic and around Lake Baikal in Russia. Buryat cuisine shares many dishes in common with Mongolian cuisine and has been influenced by  Soviet and Russian cuisine.

Common Dishes

Most dishes are lamb or beef based but fish dishes are common especially around Lake Baikal. There are also a number of dairy products made by the Buryats. Buryat cuisine is simple and hearty with very little spice. The Buryats like the Mongols are known for their Buuz, a type of steamed dumpling.

Popular Buryat foods

 Buuzy (Бузы) also known as Pozy or Buuz in Mongolia, are meat filled steamed dumplings usually filled with a mixture of either lamb or beef with onions. 

 Buchler (Бучлер) is a lamb soup with hand cut noodles and potatoes. 

 Shulep (Шулэн) is a mutton soup with egg noodles and sometimes dumplings.

 Bukhelor (Бухел) is a spiced meat and vegetable stew with Siberian herbs.

 Sagudai (Сагудаи) a local version of Sashimi made from fresh fish from Lake Baikal

 Khuushuur (Хушуур) are fried meat pies usually made with mutton meat and fried in mutton fat. 

 Sharbin (Шарбин) are similar to Khuushuur but are round in shape. 

 Shanki (Шанки) are a flatbread with melted local cheese and can be compared to pizza.

 Salamata (Саламата) is a local dessert made from rye and sour cream.

Dairy Products

 Airkhan (Аирхан) is a type or local dried cottage cheese.

 Khuruud (Хурууд) is a traditional Buryat hard cheese.

 Urme (Урме) is a dairy product made from the milk fat and milk foam which is boiled and then skimmed. The final product is similar to kaymak or clotted cream.

References

See also

 Mongolian cuisine
 Buryats
 Buuz
 Russian cuisine